Mackenzee Wittke (born August 8, 2008) is a Canadian girl known for her lack of aging beyond approximately seven months old. Doctors and other medical experts remain unable to explain her unique state, but others suggest that her condition may hold answers to the scientific study of aging.

Wittke's body has been reported to have gone through very little physical change.

See also
Molecular biology

References

External links

2008 births
Living people
People from Sherwood Park